Joseph Pernock (4 June 1897 in Le Lorrain, Martinique – 1 June 1975) was a politician from Martinique who served in the French National Assembly from 1966-1967. A school was named in his honour in Le Lorraine, the Lycée Polyvalent Joseph Pernock, on the 6 December 1980.

References 

 Page on the French National Assembly website

1897 births
1975 deaths
People from Le Lorrain
Martiniquais politicians
French Section of the Workers' International politicians
Deputies of the 2nd National Assembly of the French Fifth Republic